The following is a list of Marathon races located in Oceania (currently Australia and New Zealand).

Legend

Race List

See also

IAAF Road Race Label Events
List of marathon races in Africa
List of marathon races in Asia
List of marathon races in Europe
List of marathon races in North America
List of marathon races in South America

References

 
Australia sport-related lists
Lists of sports events in Australia